Ruta 35 or Ruta 35, la válvula de escape (English: Route 35, the Escape Route), is a Spanish-language television series produced by Venevisión International Productions and Univision Studios, and distributed by Cisneros Media Distribution. The series consists of a one season and 65 episodes.

The series premiered on January 12, 2016 until February 26, 2016 on UniMás with a total of 32 episodes.

Plot 
The plot revolves around Dylan Wilkins, a federal agent. Narrating the story in first person, Wilkins presents a kaleidoscope of men and women who make the crucial decision to collaborate with the law to avoid a legal process or reduce their criminal charges.

From a 75-year-old grandmother who fell into the trap of transporting drugs for a companion work. Until a software engineer whose close ties to a Mexican cartel give unparalleled access. Since the informant "professional" carrying many years living a dangerous double life. Until the premium of a ruthless kingpin, thirsting for reward offering on his head. These "snitches" risk their lives day after day in a dark and difficult, mission driven by diverse personal reasons such as fear, greed, revenge, and even love.

Cast 
 Danna García as Sofía Bermúdez
 Miguel Rodarte as Rogelio Bermúdez
 Julio Bracho as Don Domingo
 Lucho Velasco
 Osvaldo Benavides as Mercurio Acosta
 Isabel Moreno as Conchita
 Alexander Torres as Federico Bermúdez
 Paulo Quevedo
 Geraldine Galván as Julia
 Zeus Mendoza as Dylan Wilkins
 Danilo Carrera

References

External links 

Venezuelan telenovelas
American telenovelas
Spanish-language telenovelas
2016 telenovelas
2016 American television series debuts
2016 Venezuelan television series debuts
Television shows set in Miami
Works about Mexican drug cartels